According to most adherents of the Latter Day Saint movement, the Book of Mormon is a 19th-century translation of a record of ancient inhabitants of the American continent, which was written in a script which the book refers to as "reformed Egyptian". This claim, as well as all claims to historical authenticity of the Book of Mormon, are rejected by non-Latter Day Saint historians and scientists.<ref>Simon G. Southerton, Losing a Lost Tribe: Native Americans, DNA, and the Mormon Church (2004, Signature Books).</ref>Statement of Smithsonian Institution regarding Book of Mormon. Linguistically based assertions are frequently cited and discussed in the context of the subject of the Book of Mormon, both in favor of and against the book's claimed origins.

Both critics and promoters of the Book of Mormon have used linguistic methods to analyze the text. Promoters have published claims of stylistic forms that Joseph Smith and his contemporaries are unlikely to have known about, as well as similarities to Egyptian and Hebrew. Critics of the Book of Mormon claim there are places where the language is anachronistic and suggestive of a 19th-century origin consistent with Smith's upbringing and life experience, as well as the books and other literature published just preceding the time that the Book of Mormon was published.

A problem with linguistic reviews of the Book of Mormon is that the claimed original text is either unavailable for study or never existed. Smith said that he returned the golden plates to an angel after he finished the translation.

Native American language-development
In 1922, LDS Church general authority B. H. Roberts (1857–1933) conducted an in-depth review of the research regarding language development and dialects among the Native American peoples; the University of Illinois Press published Roberts's study posthumously in 1985 as Studies of the Book of Mormon.

Making the assumption that the majority of Native Americans descend from the peoples described in the Book of Mormon, Roberts noted that linguistic evidence among the Native American peoples does not appear to support the Book of Mormon narrative, inasmuch as the diverse language stocks and dialects that exist would not have had enough time to develop from a single language dating from A.D. 400 (the approximate date of the conclusion of the Book of Mormon record). Roberts noted:

Apologists from FARMS
have published studies that claim that the linguistic evidence cited by Roberts does not necessarily contradict the narrative of the Book of Mormon. Specifically, if one adheres to the limited geography model, then it is possible that many of the peoples of the Book of Mormon are not the principal ancestors of the Native Americans.. See citations in note 4 therein.

Linguistic anachronisms

Critics of the Book of Mormon have claimed that a variety of linguistic anachronisms exist in it which cast doubt upon its historical authenticity. Linguistic anachronisms in the Book of Mormon are words that represent concepts that are not believed to have existed in the Americas between 2500 BC and AD 400, or in the Jewish world of Lehi's time—the period of history covered by the narrative of the Book of Mormon. Mormon apologists dispute these claims, with some arguing that during the translation of the golden plates, Smith may have chosen words that he knew that were closest in meaning to the original concept written on the plates (i.e., a "translator's anachronism").

"Christ" and "Messiah"
The words "Christ" and "Messiah" are used several hundred times throughout the Book of Mormon. The first instance of the word "Christ" dates to between 559 and 545 BC. The first instance of the word "Messiah" dates to about 600 BC.

"Christ" is the English transliteration of the Greek word  (transliterated as Christós); it is relatively synonymous with the Hebrew word משיח, pronounced  and rendered "Messiah". Both words have the meaning of "anointed", and are used in the Bible to refer to "the Anointed One". In Greek translations of the Old Testament (including the Septuagint), the word "Christ" is used for the Hebrew "Messiah", and in Hebrew translations of the New Testament, the word "Messiah" is used for the Greek "Christ". Any passage in the Bible that uses the word "Christ" can substitute the word "Messiah" or "the Messiah" with no change in meaning (e.g.).

The Book of Mormon uses both terms throughout the book. In the vast majority of cases, it uses the terms in an identical manner as the Bible, where it does not matter which word is used:

Richard Packham argues that the Greek word "Christ" in the Book of Mormon challenges the authenticity of the work since Smith clearly stated that "there was no Greek or Latin upon the plates from which I, through the grace of the Lord, translated the Book of Mormon."

Apologists note that the word "Christ" is a translational equivalent to the term "Messiah", arguing that "it is no more anachronistic for pre-Christian era Book of Mormon peoples to believe in a coming Messiah/Christ than it was for Old Testament prophets to believe in a coming Messiah/Christ."

"Church" and "synagogue"

The word "church" first occurs in 1 Nephi 4:26, where a prophet named Nephi disguises himself as Laban, a prominent man in Jerusalem whom Nephi had slain:

And he [Laban's servant], supposing that I spake of the brethren of the church, and that I was truly that Laban whom I had slain, wherefore he did follow me.

According to the Book of Mormon, this exchange happened in Jerusalem, around 600 BC. The meaning of the word "church" in the Book of Mormon is more comparable to usage in the Bible than Modern English. The concept of a church, meaning "a convocation of believers", existed among the House of Israel prior to Christianity. For instance, Psalms  speaks of praising the Lord "in the congregation of the saints"; the Septuagint contains the Greek word ecclesia for "congregation", which is also translated as "church" in the New Testament.

A similar question regards the word "synagogue", found in Alma 16:13:

And Alma and Amulek went forth preaching repentance to the people in their temples, and in their sanctuaries, and also in their synagogues, which were built after the manner of the Jews.

Critics of the Book of Mormon note that synagogues did not exist in their modern form before the destruction of the temple and the Babylonian captivity. The oldest known synagogue is located in Delos, Greece, and has been dated to 150 BC. Mormon apologist William J. Adams cites archaeologist Lee I. Levine in suggesting that synagogues did in fact exist before the Babylonian captivity, though in a different form.

Other anachronisms

Craig L. Blomberg has pointed out several verses in the Book Mormon apparently similar to biblical verses in the King James version of the Bible. Blomberg summarizes his overall position on Book of Mormon anachronisms as follows: "Indeed, the entire Book of Mormon abounds with explicit references to Christ, to his life and ministry and to the three persons of the Godhead long before New Testament times ... even though none of these concepts or terms ever appear in these forms in the Old Testament or any other ancient Jewish literature."

Chiasmus
Chiasmus is a form of rhetorical parallelism wherein key ideas familiar to the reader are inverted, usually for some kind of emphasis. Chiasmus appears in many languages, including English,Davis, William L. "Better a Witty Fool Than a Foolish Wit: The Art of Shakespeare's Chiasmus." Text and Performance Quarterly 23 (2003): 311-30 Ugaritic, Biblical Hebrew, Aramaic, Greek, Latin. and Ancient K'iche' Maya.  It is found in the Bible and other ancient Middle Eastern poetry.

Book of Mormon
Examples of chiasmus can be found in the Book of Mormon. Some have argued chiasmus is evidence of the text's historical authenticity, suggesting it reflects the Semitic background of Nephi and other authors of the Book of Mormon. They claim that such findings support claims of Hebrew origins in the text on the basis that chiasmus is often found in Hebrew texts such as the Bible.

In 1969, John W. Welch discovered a variety of instances of chiasmus in the Book of Mormon and along with his discovery came attention to the phenomenon. Welch claims that it is unlikely, although not impossible, that Smith knew about chiasmus at the time of the Book of Mormon's publication, which implies that chiasmus could only be present in the text if indeed the text is a translation and not a fabrication.

Others argue that chiasmus is not necessarily evidence of Hebrew origin.

Still others disagree on the extent to which chiasmus occurs in the text. With regard to the Alma chapter 36 chiasmus, one critic alleges that Welch "fashioned a chiasm by selecting elements from repetitious language, creatively labeling elements, ignoring text, pairing unbalanced elements, and even including asymmetrical elements".

Welch himself offers the following caution regarding a tendency of enthusiastic readers to see chiasmus where it is not actually present:

Some people, of course, have gone overboard with this search, and caution must be employed; otherwise, it is possible to find chiasmus in the telephone book, and the effort becomes meaningless . ... One must be careful in this quest, however, to avoid the problems of the 'hammer syndrome'—to the person holding a hammer, everything looks like a nail. To the person who knows only chiasmus and no other form of literary composition, everything may start looking like a chiasm.

Hugh W. Pinnock, an LDS Church general authority, stated:

Because the study of Hebrew writing forms in the Book of Mormon can strengthen testimony and be quite exciting, a number of researchers and laypersons have become overly enthusiastic, much to the detriment of the subject and integrity of their studies.

Occurrence in other LDS scriptures
Some claim writings in the form of chiasmus can also be found in the Doctrine and Covenants and the Pearl of Great Price, two other works of scripture in the LDS canon that were dictated by Smith. Critics believe this supports their claim that Smith knew about chiasmus, and that it may have been a characteristic of his personal writing style.

Charles G. Kroupa and Richard C. Shipp are notable for publishing arguments for chiasmus in the Doctrine and Covenants in 1972. In 1975, Shipp also produced a masters thesis titled, "Conceptual Patterns of Repetition in the Doctrine and Covenants and Their Implications" claiming that writings found in the Doctrine and Covenants had literary patterns similar to chiasmus. In 2004, a study was published by LDS researchers which used statistical analysis to determine the likelihood that a chiastic structure in LDS works appeared by chance as opposed to being created deliberately. Mathematical formulas were used to calculate a set of probabilities that provided the ability to distinguish between strong and weak chiastic structures. The authors concluded:

Based on these estimates, we conclude that the likelihood is high that chiastic structure appeared by design in the Pentateuch and in the Book of Mormon. Our estimates do not support such a conclusion for the Doctrine and Covenants [or] the Book of Abraham ... indicating instead that chiasms could have appeared in these works by chance.

Other works containing chiasmus
Chiastic patterns have also been found in the Book of the Law of the Lord, a purported translation of an ancient text by James J. Strang. This book is not considered authentic by the LDS Church, the Community of Christ or any Latter Day Saint sect other than the Strangite church.

Critics point out that the presence of chiasmus in Strang's writing as well as in the literature of other cultures implies that the source could be non-Hebrew. Additionally, that the presence of chiasmus is not necessarily indicative of ancient origins.

Stylometry

Statistical analysis
Stylometry is a method of statistical analysis used to determine authorship of various texts. It has been used to analyze disputed works of Shakespeare, contrast books of the Bible, identify the authors of twelve disputed Federalist Papers, and compare styles of various authors such as Jane Austen. 

In 1980, researchers at Brigham Young University used stylometric techniques they called "wordprint analysis" to examine the possible authors of the Book of Mormon. They reached the conclusion that none of the Book of Mormon selections they studied resembled writings of any of the suggested nineteenth-century authors, including Joseph Smith. Jerald and Sandra Tanner challenged these findings on various points, most notably questioning the reliability of the data sources used and the methodology of the "wordprint analysis". Additionally, D. James Croft wrote in Sunstone that there were several flaws in the methodology that were vulnerable to criticism.

A later stylometric study was undertaken by Mormon researcher John Hilton and his non-LDS colleagues at Berkeley, who "went to great pains to immunize the methodology from criticism" through the use of control tests.

The Berkeley group first used a variety of control tests with non-disputed authors (e.g., works by Mark Twain, and translated works from German) in an effort to:

 Demonstrate the persistence of wordprints despite an author's effort to write as a different "character", and
 Demonstrate that wordprints were not obliterated by translation (e.g., two different authors rendered by the same translator would still have different wordprints).

Hilton concluded that, if wordprinting is a valid technique, then this analysis suggests that it is "statistically indefensible" to claim that Smith, Oliver Cowdery, or Solomon Spalding wrote the 30,000 words in the Book of Mormon attributed to Nephi and Alma. 

One prominent Mormon scholar, John A. Tvedtnes, has rejected the use of wordprint evidence as the foundation for a testimony of the Book of Mormon's validity, though he did not dismiss its possible usefulness as a scientific tool to investigate the book's origins. Upon review of the Berkeley study, another scholar, Kevin L. Barney, remains unconvinced of the validity of wordprint analysis:

I have always felt that the basic assumptions underlying Book of Mormon wordprint studies are faulty. I concur with the assessment of John Tvedtnes, who points out that (1) an English translation should reflect the language of the translator rather than the original author, and (2) the particles used in wordprint studies (such as "of") are often non-existent in Hebrew, which tends to use syntax to express the meaning of English particles.

However, in the same article, Barney confessed, "I frankly do not understand the statistics well enough to offer a useful critique of the studies."

In a peer-reviewed study using a traditional authorship method and a new pattern-classification technique, several researchers at Stanford University concluded that Sidney Rigdon, Solomon Spalding, and Oliver Cowdery were more likely to have written the book out of a pool of authors that also included Parley P. Pratt and two statistical control authors (Henry Wadsworth Longfellow and Joel Barlow). Smith was not included in the pool of authors because a set of original works written by Smith alone could not be identified with confidence. However, this study only examined the relative likelihood of the five above-mentioned authors writing the Book of Mormon, not the possibility of an author or authors outside the five-person pool. Another study was published in the same journal that critiqued the methodology used in the earlier study and, using Smith's personal writings written in his own handwriting, concluded that stylometric evidence supports neither Smith nor a Spalding–Rigdon authorship.

In a 1991 study for the journal History and Computing, non-Mormon David Holmes used a multivariate technique to analyze the Book of Mormon and the Doctrine of the Covenants. He concluded that they were from the same author, Joseph Smith. He finished with: 
It is my conclusion, from the results of this research and the supporting historical evidence, that the Book of Mormon sprang from the 'prophetic voice' of Joseph Smith himself, as did his revelations and the text of the Book of Abraham. We have seen that the style of his 'prophetic voice' as evidenced by the main cluster of the textual samples studied, differs from the style of his personal writings or dictations of a personal nature.

Proper names

Hebrew names
Apologists note that many of the proper names in the Book of Mormon are Hebrew names found in the Bible (e.g., "Lehi", "Lemuel", "Ammon", and "Enos").  Tvedtnes, Gee and Roper argue that there are a number of Hebrew names found in the Book of Mormon which do not appear in the Bible but occur in other ancient sources. Examples of these are "Aha", "Ammonihah", "Hagoth", "Himni", "Isabel", "Jarom", "Josh", "Luram", "Mathoni", "Mathonihah", "Muloki" and "Sam". Hugh Nibley also states that many non-biblical names found in the Book of Mormon resemble words from ancient Hebrew (e.g., "Sariah", "Jarom", and "Josh"). Milton R. Hunter and Thomas Ferguson allege that Hebraic fragments and roots appear discernible in Nephite/Mulekite names such as "Zarahemla". These names are often interpreted as evidence in favor of the Book of Mormon, since Smith's knowledge of Hebrew was limited to names found in the Bible.

Critics have pointed out that many of the names in the Book of Mormon that are not drawn from the King James Bible are found in the local environment around Palmyra, New York, and would have been known to Smith.A Linguist Looks at Mormonism, More on Book of Mormon Names Richard Packham has pointed out that several Biblical Hebrew names, including "Aaron", "Ephraim", and "Levi" are listed as Jaredites in the Book of Ether. He argues that these are anachronisms, since the Jaredites are supposed to have originated from the time of the Tower of Babel, and presumably did not speak Hebrew. In addition, Packham has pointed out that while "Isabel" is derived from the ancient Hebrew Elizabeth, the name Isabel did not exist until 12th century Spain, which he argues is evidence against the authenticity of the Book of Mormon.

Mesoamerican names
Mormon archaeologist Bruce W. Warren has noted that some Jaredite names may have become a part of later Nephite culture, suggesting that there may have been survivors or refugees of the great Jaredite battle besides Coriantumr. He cites the names "Kib", "Kish", "Shule", and "Com" as examples of Jaredite names that are similar to names found in ancient Mesoamerica.

Egyptian names
John Gee, John A. Tvedtnes, and Hugh Nibley argue that some Book of Mormon names appear to be Egyptian. Tvedtnes, Gee, and Roper note that William F. Albright considered the names "Paanchi" and "Pahoran" to be Egyptian names. In his book Lehi in the Desert, Nibley compares names found in the Book of Mormon with ancient Egyptian names from Upper Egypt. The comparisons show that many names in the Book of Mormon are similar to names in a certain region and era of ancient Egypt. Nibley postulates that names do not match exactly due to the process of metathesis. Parallels drawn by Nibley between Egyptian names and Book of Mormon names include "Paanchi" and "Pahoran", and further include several others including "Korihor" (Kherihor, a high priest at Thebes) and "Morianton" (Meriaton, an Egyptian prince), and "Ammon" (Amun, the most common name in ancient Egypt).

Thomas Finley has disagreed with these claims. Critics claim that the parallels drawn by Nibley and others ignore the possibility of simple coincidence and lack a defined methodology for assessing the importance of the parallels. Tvetdnes and Roper responded by noting that there are too many coincidences for such an assessment to be credible.

Smith, in a letter written in 1843 to the Mormon publication Millennial Star, wrote that the name "Mormon" came from "the Egyptian Mon, hence with the addition of more, or the contraction, mor, we have the word Mormon, which means, literally, more good." Benjamin Urrutia suggests the name "Mormon" is derived from Egyptian "mor" ("love") and mon ("firmly established"), rendering "Mormon" as "love is firmly established." Packham criticizes Smith's interpretation, stating that the English word "more" or "mor" is out of place in an Egyptian name.

Greek names
Smith stated in a letter to the editor of Times and Seasons, "there was no Greek or Latin upon the plates from which I, through the grace of the Lord, translated the Book of Mormon." Brian D. Stubbs has stated that though the language of the Mulekites is not put forward in the Book of Mormon, it could have consisted of Phoenician, Greek, or Arabic.

Richard Packham has pointed out that the Book of Mormon contains some Greek and Latin names, some of which are hellenizations of Hebrew names (e.g., "Antipas", "Archeantus", "Esrom", "Ezias", "Judea", and "Zenos") and some of which are Greek or Latin.

Word choice in translation

The mechanics of the method by which the Book of Mormon was claimed to have been translated have been examined by various scholars in order to determine how words were chosen. Various accounts from witnesses to the translation process exist, including David Whitmer and Martin Harris, two of the Three Witnesses. Statements of the exact methods used in translation vary depending upon the account. A number of these accounts were written many years after the events occurred.

Method of translation
LDS Church authorities do not claim to know the exact method by which translation and word choice was accomplished. In an address given in 1992 at a seminar for new mission presidents at the Missionary Training Center, church apostle Russell M. Nelson stated that "[t]he details of this miraculous method of translation are still not fully known." In order to illustrate this, Nelson quoted the words Whitmer, who wrote regarding the use of a seer stone in the translation process over 50 years after it had occurred,

Joseph Smith would put the seer stone into a hat, and put his face in the hat, drawing it closely around his face to exclude the light; and in the darkness the spiritual light would shine. A piece of something resembling parchment would appear, and on that appeared the writing. One character at a time would appear, and under it was the interpretation in English. Brother Joseph would read off the English to Oliver Cowdery, who was his principal scribe, and when it was written down and repeated to Brother Joseph to see if it was correct, then it would disappear, and another character with the interpretation would appear. Thus the Book of Mormon was translated by the gift and power of God, and not by any power of man.

Nelson also noted statements made by Smith's wife Emma, who gave her account of the translation method in 1856:

When my husband was translating the Book of Mormon, I wrote a part of it, as he dictated each sentence, word for word, and when he came to proper names he could not pronounce, or long words, he spelled them out, and while I was writing them, if I made any mistake in spelling, he would stop me and correct my spelling although it was impossible for him to see how I was writing them down at the time. Even the word Sarah he could not pronounce at first, but had to spell it, and I would pronounce it for him.

Martin Harris (as quoted by Edward Stevenson in the Deseret News in 1881) described the translation process as follows:

By aid of the seer stone, sentences would appear and were read by the Prophet . ... [W]hen finished [Smith] would say "Written," and if correctly written that sentence would disappear and another appear in its place, but if not written correctly it remained until corrected, so that the translation was just as it was engraven on the plates, precisely in the language then used.

Word substitution
One challenge in performing a linguistic analysis of the Book of Mormon is that no original text is available for analysis; only handwritten printers' copies transcribed from the original handwritten copies of the original English text, and a few pages of the original translation produced by Smith are available. As with any translation, the influence of the translator is inextricably part of the translated text in matters of word choice. Some Mormon scholars have theorized that when words are found in the Book of Mormon that seem anachronistic, or that refer to items not known to have existed in the pre-Columbian Americas during the period of time covered by the Book of Mormon (e.g., horse, elephant, chicken, cattle, swine, barley, bull, calf, and hilt), these words could be an approximation "in translation" to things that did exist in pre-Columbian America.

One common criticism of the authenticity of the Book of Mormon is the belief that, if the accounts of the translation process are accurate, then there is very little room for error in the word choices used in the translation of the Book of Mormon (since each word was believed to be divinely approved and could not be written incorrectly). In other words, "steel" must mean steel, "hilt" must mean hilt, "elephant" must mean elephant, and so forth. However, as Whitmer was never directly involved in the translation and Harris was involved for only a brief period of time, Mormon apologists consider it unlikely that either of these accounts is as accurate as the accounts of Smith and Cowdery.

Grammar
Several critics have pointed to grammatical errors in the Early Modern English style of the Book of Mormon and made the argument that because the original manuscript, the printer's manuscript, and the first edition of the Book of Mormon appear to have contained hundreds of grammatical errors, the book was therefore fabricated by Smith and not divinely inspired.Perry Benjamin Pierce, 1899, "The Origin of the 'Book of Mormon'", American Anthropologist n.s. 1:675–94.  Examples include (standard citations given):
 "Adam and Eve, which was our first parents" (1 Nephi 5:11)
 "And this he done that he might subject them to him" (Alma 2:10)
 "that they did not fight against God no more"  (Alma 23:7)
 "thou remembereth the twelve apostles of the Lamb" (1 Nephi 12:9)
 "and I have not written but a small part of the things I saw" (1 Nephi 14:28)
 "therefore they did not look unto the Lord as they had ought" (1 Nephi 15:3)
 "and the words of Amulek which was declared unto the people" (Alma 9 (preface))
 "Now the object of these lawyers were to get gain" (Alma 10:32)
 2 Nephi 1:30–32, Lehi speaks to Zoram: "And now, Zoram, I speak unto you: Behold, thou art the servant of Laban ... if ye shall keep the commandments of the Lord, the Lord hath consecrated this land for the security of thy seed with the seed of my son."  You/ye are plural pronouns and thou/thy are singular pronouns, but the text switches back and forth between them.
 2 Nephi 3:1, Lehi says: "And now I speak unto you, Joseph, my last-born. Thou wast born in the wilderness of mine afflictions ..."  You is incorrectly used when addressing a single individual.
 Mosiah 2:19–20, King Benjamin says: "O how you ought to thank your heavenly King! ... if you should render all the thanks and praise".  You is the object form of the second person plural pronoun; ye'' is the subject form, but the object form is incorrectly used in subject position here and also in dozens of other places throughout the text.

LDS Linguistic researcher Stanford Carmack has responded to this issue by providing evidence of Early Modern English usage of the above forms: "many ostensibly defective forms reflect usage from earlier stages of the English language. Most of these are clearly attested in the textual record of EModE and even late ME—some frequently, some rarely. ... BofM language is, generally speaking, only nonstandard from our standpoint, centuries after the Elizabethan era, which appears to be the epicenter of the book's syntax."

LDS Church apostle George A. Smith responded to this issue: "[when] the Lord reveals anything to men He reveals it in language that accords with their own. If any of you were to converse with an angel, and you used strictly grammatical language he would do the same. But if you used two negatives in a sentence the heavenly messenger would use language to correspond with your understanding, and this very objection to the Book of Mormon is an evidence in its favor."

Parallelomania
Critics of Book of Mormon linguistic studies often reject the claims of Mormon scholars on the grounds that the parallels they draw between Book of Mormon and other sources amounts to "parallelomania", which is defined as the "over use or improper use of parallels in the exposition of a text."

One researcher, Douglas F. Salmon, alleged that Mormon scholars' work in drawing parallels between the Book of Mormon and other sources fits this classification.  Salmon notes:

There has been an exegetical trend during the last several decades to draw endless parallels to text from the ancient Near East and beyond in an attempt to validate the writings in the Book of Mormon and Pearl of Great Price. The pioneer and leader in this effort has been the great LDS scholar Hugh Nibley. In recent years the Foundation for Ancient Research and Mormon Studies (FARMS) has continued this legacy. The number of parallels that Nibley has been able to uncover from amazingly disparate and arcane sources is truly staggering. Unfortunately, there seems to be a neglect of any methodological reflection or articulation in this endeavor.

Salmon also notes that Nibley was a critic of parallelomania where it is used to disparage the Book of Mormon, despite his extensive scholarship on the subject in defense of the Book of Mormon, noting that Nibley "ignores" the fact that parallels may suggest a unity of religious thought, or simple coincidence. He also goes on to demonstrate several instances where Nibley misrepresented the parallels and jumped to conclusions regarding the significance of his examples.

Salmon's analysis of Nibley was itself later critiqued in a response to his article from William Hamblin of FARMS. Among other things, Hamblin criticized Salmon for critiquing a few weakly supported parallels made by Nibley while ignoring both much more strongly supported parallels made by Nibley and "a broader analysis" of Nibley's arguments.

Notes

References

Sources

External links
 Hebraisms and Other Ancient Peculiarities in the Book of Mormon
 Finding Biblical Hebrew and Other Ancient Literary Forms in the Book of Mormon

Book of Mormon studies
Criticism of Mormonism
Book of Mormon